Pierre Marion "Huck" Hartman (October 23, 1920 – March 25, 1946) was an American professional basketball player. Hartman played in the National Basketball League (NBL) for the Pittsburgh Raiders in 1944–45 and the Youngstown Bears in 1945–46. He died on March 25, 1946, aged 25, from pneumonia, just two weeks after the completion of the season. Hartman was the first active player to die in the NBL.

References

External links
NBL career statistics

1920 births
1946 deaths
American men's basketball players
Basketball players from Pennsylvania
Centers (basketball)
Deaths from pneumonia in Pennsylvania
Duquesne Dukes men's basketball players
Pittsburgh Raiders players
People from Westmoreland County, Pennsylvania
Washington & Jefferson Presidents men's basketball players
Youngstown Bears players